The women's singles of the 2005 ECM Prague Open tournament was played on clay in Prague, Czech Republic.

This event was last held in 1998.

Dinara Safina won the title.

Seeds

Draw

Finals

Top half

Bottom half

References

External links
 Official results archive

2005 Women's Singles
2005 in Czech women's sport